Shaun Edward Byneveldt is a South African diplomat and politician who is the current South African ambassador to the State of Palestine. Previously, he
served as the South African Ambassador to Syria from 2010 to 2018. He was the Speaker of the Western Cape Provincial Parliament from 2004 to 2009. Byneveldt is a member of the African National Congress (ANC).

References

Living people
South African politicians
South African diplomats
Members of the Western Cape Provincial Parliament
African National Congress politicians
Cape Coloureds
Year of birth missing (living people)